Little Crow Foods is a food company based in Warsaw, Indiana. It was founded in 1903 by W.F. Maish, Sr. as a flour mill. After a major fire in 1919, the company began selling five-pound sacks of pancake mix. CoCo Wheats (hot cereal) were introduced in 1930, Miracle Maize (corn bread and muffin mix) in 1939, Fryin' Magic (seasoning) in 1953, Fastshake (pancake mix in a bottle) in 1985, and Bakin' Miracle (seasoning) in 1989.

Sources
http://www.littlecrowfoods.com/history/

External links
 Company website

Companies based in Indiana
Food and drink companies established in 1903
Food manufacturers of the United States